Macauley Jones (born 8 October 1994) is an Australian racing driver who competes in the Repco Supercars Championship, driving a Holden Commodore ZB for Brad Jones Racing.

Son of Brad, nephew of Kim and cousin of Andrew, Jones comes from a family with a large history in Australian motorsport. He has continued the family success having won the 2011 South Australian Rotax Light Championship in karting, and having won races in the 2012 and 2013 season of Australian Formula Ford. 

Jones has competed with his father's team in the Dunlop Super2 Series since 2014. His Supercars Championship debut came at the 2015 Wilson Security Sandown 500 alongside Dale Wood.

Career results

Supercars Championship results

Bathurst 1000 results

References

External links

Macauley Jones V8 Supercars Official Profile
Profile on Racing Reference

1994 births
Formula Ford drivers
Living people
Supercars Championship drivers
Australian racing drivers
Sportspeople from Albury
Racing drivers from New South Wales
20th-century Australian people
21st-century Australian people
Toyota Racing Series drivers
M2 Competition drivers